The Phaeosphaeriaceae are a family of fungi in the order Pleosporales. Species in the family have a cosmopolitan distribution, and are generally nectrotrophic or saprobic on a wide range of plants.

Genera list
Barria
Bricookea
Carinispora
Chaetoplea - placement tentative
Didymocyrtis
Eudarluca - placement tentative
Hadrospora
Isthmosporella
Katumotoa
Lautitia - placement tentative
Metameris
Mixtura
Neophaeosphaeria
Nodulosphaeria
Ophiosphaerella
Phaeosphaeria
Phaeosphaeriopsis
Setomelanomma
 Stagonospora
Teratosphaeria - placement tentative
Wilmia

References

Bibliography

 
Dothideomycetes families
Taxa named by Margaret Elizabeth Barr-Bigelow
Taxa described in 1979